Continuance is a 1999 album by jazz fusion band Greetings From Mercury.  It was recorded live at Vooruit, Ghent, Belgium.

Track listing
"Hospitality"
"Closer"
"Green"
"Let The Children Speak"
"Continuance"
"Snakes"

Personnel
 Jeroen Van Herzeele - tenor saxophone, leader
 Peter Hertmans - electric guitar and guitar synthesizer
 Otti Van Der Werf - electric bass
 Stéphane Galland - drums
 Steven Segers - rap
 Michel Andina - sitar
 Virgilio Herrera Estrada - lead singer

References

External links
 Jazz in Belgium website

Greetings From Mercury albums
1999 albums